Fletcher Challenge Energy Ltd v Electricity Corporation of New Zealand Ltd [2002] 2 NZLR 433 regarding certainty in contract formation.

Background

Western Mining Corporation was selling its 40% stake in the Kupe gas field, for which Fletcher Challenge Energy and Electricity Corporation were interested in buying. ECNZ was particularly interested as it was planning to convert the Huntly power station with gas.

Both companies entered into an agreement that if one of them purchased the WMC share, that they would split the gas between them.

The contract was called a Heads of Agreement (HoA), but it left several matters unresolved, "to use all reasonable endeavors to agree to a full sale and purchase agreement within 3 months of the date of this agreement".

Later however, after a substantial drop in power prices, ECNZ decided to not convert the power plant.

As a result, FCE applied successfully to the High Court to make ECNZ enter into an agreement with them. ECNZ defended the issue on the basis that there was lack of certainty making the contract unenforceable.

Held
The court of appeal ruled that there was not a legally binding contract

References

Court of Appeal of New Zealand cases
New Zealand contract case law
2001 in case law
2001 in New Zealand law